This is a list of the Swiss Hitparade number ones of 2017.

Swiss charts

Romandie charts

References

 Swiss No.1 Singles and Albums 2017
 Swiss Romandie Singles Chart

Number-one hits
Switzerland
2017